Astana is the name of a city in Kazakhstan and its capital since 1997.

Astana may also refer to:

Sports
 Astana (cycling team), a professional road-cycling team
 ONCE cycling team, briefly known as Astana at the tailend of the 2006 season
 BC Astana, a basketball club based in Astana, Kazakhstan
 FC Astana, a football club based in Astana, Kazakhstan
 HC Astana, a hockey club based in Astana, Kazakhstan

Other uses
 Air Astana, an airline based in Kazakhstan
 The Astana (palace), a palace in Sarawak, Malaysia
 Astana (radio), a news and music station broadcasting from Astana, Kazakhstan
 Astana Cemetery, an archaeological site in Xinjiang, China
 Astana TV, a Kazakh television channel based in Astana, Kazakhstan

See also
 Astaneh (disambiguation)